The New Beginning in Osaka (2020) was a professional wrestling pay-per-view (PPV) event, promoted by New Japan Pro-Wrestling (NJPW). It took place on February 9, 2020 at the Osaka-jō Hall in Osaka, Japan.

Production

Storylines
The New Beginning in Osaka featured professional wrestling matches that involved different wrestlers from pre-existing scripted feuds and storylines. Wrestlers portrayed villains, heroes, or less distinguishable characters in scripted events that built tension and culminated in a wrestling match or series of matches.

At Wrestle Kingdom 14, the IWGP Intercontinental Champion Tetsuya Naito defeated Kazuchika Okada to win the IWGP Heavyweight Championship becoming the first ever dual IWGP Heavyweight and Intercontinental champion. After the match, he was attacked by Kenta, leading to a match at New Year Dash!! as Naito and Los Ingobernables de Japón teammate Sanada would take on Kenta and his Bullet Club partner Jay White, which Naito and Sanada won. After the match, Naito and Sanada were assaulted by Kenta and White, and a match was scheduled for The New Beginning in Osaka, with both championships on the line.

At the 2019 World Tag League final, Jon Moxley made his return to NJPW after an absence and attacked Lance Archer and Minoru Suzuki. At Wrestle Kingdom 14 on January 5, after Moxley had successfully defended his IWGP United States Championship against Juice Robinson, Suzuki confronted Moxley before beating him down and proclaiming he wanted Moxley's title. Later, a match was arranged between the two for the United States Championship at The New Beginning in Osaka.

At the end of New Year Dash!!, while White and Kenta were brutalizing Naito and Sanada, White claimed that Sanada was inferior to himself, leading to a match between the two at The New Beginning in Osaka being set up.

At a press conference on January 7, Manabu Nakanishi announced that he planned to retire on February 22. As part of his farewell tour, it was announced that he would wrestle his final match at Osaka-jo Hall at The New Beginning in Osaka, where he would team with Tencozy (Hiroyoshi Tenzan and Satoshi Kojima) and Yuji Nagata to take on Taguchi Japan (Ryusuke Taguchi, Toa Henare, Tomoaki Honma, and Togi Makabe).

Results

See also
2020 in professional wrestling
List of NJPW pay-per-view events

References

2020 in professional wrestling
February 2020 events in Japan